Our Men in Bagdad is a 1966 Italian-French Eurospy film starring Rory Calhoun. It marked the directorial debut of Paolo Bianchini after about sixty films as assistant director. It was shot between Algeria, Rome and Civitavecchia.

Plot

Cast  
  Rory Calhoun as Alex 
Roger Hanin as Sadov 
Evi Marandi as Sonja
Ralph Baldwin as Dimitri  
Jean Gaven as General Yuri Fiodorenko 
Lea Padovani as Fiodorenko's partner
Tino Carraro as The Professor
John Karlsen as Botschafter

References

External links

1966 films
1960s spy thriller films
Italian spy thriller films
French spy thriller films
Films directed by Paolo Bianchini
Films shot in Algeria
1966 directorial debut films
Films scored by Roberto Pregadio
1960s Italian-language films
1960s French films
1960s Italian films